John F. Kennedy High School is a public, four-year high school and International Baccalaureate (IB) World School in the city of La Palma, California.  Kennedy gets most of its students from the junior high school across the street, Walker Junior High School.

History
John F. Kennedy High School opened to 1,488 students in the 10th and 11th grades on September 14, 1964. For its first year of operation, there was no senior class. Kenneth MacPherson was Kennedy's first principal. Most buildings were ready except the dressing rooms, the gym, and playing fields. The school was to be named Centralia, in keeping with Board policy to name high schools after an elementary school district in the area; however, the assassination of John F. Kennedy in 1963 prompted a group of patrons to have the school (then under construction) renamed in his honor.

In the fall of 2011, the administration of Kennedy High School was criticized for its "Gold Card Program," in which students who performed well on the California Standardized Tests the previous year were given special recognition through special planners and ID cards, along with perks and bonuses at local businesses and throughout the school. Nearby Cypress High School had also implemented a similar program, but it did not receive as much media attention. Both schools have since removed or altered the program.

Currently, Kennedy serves around 2,400 students in the 9th through 12th grades. Recent construction has added a quad area, a second practice gym, renovated classrooms, a new library and counseling center, a modular "4th court," as well as an extensive music building which includes an auditorium, two band rooms, two choir rooms, practice rooms, and a new pool.

Sports
Kennedy's sports teams are known as the Fighting Irish (the senior circle looks like a three leaf clover from above). They are a member of the Empire League in CIF's Southern Section. The school's main rival is Cypress High School. The Fighting Irish football team won the CIF-SS Southern Division Championship in 2006, adding to the AAA championship they had won in 1971. 
In 2017, the boys volleyball team captured their first CIF-SS Div IV championship in program history.  It marked the first time in CIF Southern Section history a wild card team successfully captured the CIF title.

Complete list of Kennedy team CIF SS Championships
1971 - Football - Div. 3A CIF Champion	
1980 - Boys Soccer - Div. 3A CIF Champion 
1984 - Girls Softball - Div. 4A CIF Champion 	
1988 - Girls Softball - Div. 3A CIF Champion   
1988 - Boys Basketball - Div. 3A CIF Champion 	
1989 - Boys Baseball - Div. 3A CIF Champion 
2003 - Boys Soccer - Div. 3 CIF Champion 
2004 - Boys Soccer - Div. 3 CIF Champion 
2006 - Football - CIF Southern Division Champion  
2017 - Boys Volleyball - Div. 4 CIF Champion 
2019 - Boys Baseball - Div. 4 CIF Champion

International Baccalaureate Diploma Programme
The International Baccalaureate (IB) Diploma Programme is a prestigious and rigorous course of education that prepares students for study in the most elite colleges and universities worldwide. Kennedy High School has been authorized to offer the IB Diploma Programme since July 1999 and the programme is taught in English. Upon successful completion of all IB requirements and exams, students are awarded a second diploma (separate from their Kennedy diploma) that will grant one to two years of college credits. The University of California accepts IB Diploma holders as incoming sophomores.

Notable alumni

Brandon Baker, actor in films such as Johnny Tsunami, Johnny Kapahala: Back on Board
Alan Bannister, former Major League Baseball player
Ami Bera, Congressman, CA District #7
Casey Ellison, former child actor who appeared in TV sitcom Punky Brewster
Casey Fien, Major League Baseball pitcher in the Seattle Mariners' Organization
Greg Hansell, former major league baseball player
Debra Jensen, former Coppertone model, Miss January, 1978 Playboy magazine
Rhema McKnight, wide receiver for the University of Notre Dame, New Orleans Saints and San Diego Chargers
Eddie Pleasant, outside line backer for the University of Oregon, strong safety for the Houston Texans
John Stamos, actor
Vince Staples, rapper, singer, songwriter, actor
Lisa Tucker, former American Idol contestant, singer, songwriter, actress

See also
 List of memorials to John F. Kennedy

References

External links
Kennedy High School website

High schools in Orange County, California
La Palma, California
International Baccalaureate schools in California
Public high schools in California
Educational institutions established in 1964
1964 establishments in California
Monuments and memorials to John F. Kennedy in the United States